The Choctaw freedmen are former enslaved African Americans who were emancipated and granted citizenship in the Choctaw Nation after the Civil War, according to the tribe's new peace treaty with the United States. The term also applies to their contemporary descendants.

Like other American Indian tribes, the Choctaw had customarily held Indian slaves as captives from warfare. As they adopted elements of European culture, such as larger farms and plantations, the elite began to adapt their system to purchasing and holding chattel slave workers of African-American descent. Moshulatubbee held slaves, as did many of the European men, generally fur traders, who married into the Choctaw nation.  The Folsom and Greenwood LeFlore families were wealthy Choctaw planters who held the most slaves at the time of Indian Removal and afterward. After signing the treaty for Removal, LeFlore withdrew from the Choctaw Nation to stay in Mississippi and take US and state citizenship. He owned 15,000 acres of plantation and 400 enslaved African Americans.

Slavery lasted in the Choctaw Nation until after their signing of the 1866 Reconstruction Treaty. The emancipation and citizenship of the enslaved were requirements of the 1866 treaty that the US made with the Choctaw. The U.S. required a new treaty because the Choctaw had sided with the Confederate States of America during the American Civil War. The Confederacy had promised the Choctaw and other tribes of Indian Territory an exclusively Native American state if it won the war. Former slaves of the Choctaw Nation were called the Choctaw freedmen,  comparable to the African-American freedmen in the United States. They differed in that numerous people also had mixed Choctaw and/or European ancestry (the latter was also true of African Americans in the US). At the time of Indian Removal, the Beams family was a part of the Choctaw Nation. They were thought to have been of African descent and also free.

The Choctaw Freedmen were officially adopted as full members into the Choctaw Nation in 1885. In 1983, a requirement for blood relationship was added to the Nation's constitution, excluding  many Choctaw Freedmen from membership. As of 2021, the Choctaw Freedmen are still fighting for equal legal status in the tribe, as they believe they have been limited to second-class status. The Freedmen argue that the tribe has not honored the 1866 treaty. They asked Congress to withhold funding until these tribes address freedmen citizenship. By 2021, only the Cherokee Nation had updated their constitution to accept as citizens those persons who cannot prove blood descent but have ancestors registered with the Dawes Commission.

Slavery 

Prior to European colonization, the Choctaw, in line with the customs of other indigenous tribes of the American Southeast, were accustomed to taking captives in warfare. The captives would then either be enslaved or adopted by a family to replace a family member who had died. As European colonists began to settle the region in the 17th and 18th centuries, they began to purchase Indian slaves to use as workers. Tribes in the region intensified their raids on enemy villages in order to acquire captives with the specific intent of selling them to the colonists in major slave-trading centers such as New Orleans and Charles Town. Many tribes undertook such raids in order to satisfy outstanding debts they had acquired with colonial merchants in South Carolina, an issue which contributed to the eruption of the Yamasee War (1715–1717).

The history of the descendants of African and American-Indian people has been complicated because individuals have had different experiences and status in the tribes. Some Afro-Indian descendants do not identify with their Native ancestry because they were reared in more exclusively African-American environments. Others are reluctant to share stories of mixed ancestry, because of their complicated history. Others fear backlash from both African American and Native American communities, who sometimes reject those of mixed race. Others don't know anything about the hidden side of mixed ancestry. The people of African ancestry lived among Native Americans.

Reports indicated that Choctaw slaveholders frequently mistreated their slaves. Slaves, especially those who were of mixed Choctaw descent, were sometimes whipped or burned for minor offenses. Records from the period also describe instances of resistance among the enslaved; in one account, a slave was angered that his Choctaw owner, Richard Harkins failed to allow his slaves to celebrate Christmas in 1858. Prince murdered Hardins and dumped his body in a nearby river. Barbara Krauthamer says that such accounts highlighted the intersections of race, gender, and power relations that informed the interactions between “black slaves and Indian masters” in Indian Territory.

Social structure 

The Freedmen had an ambiguous role within the Choctaw Nation. During the first decade of the twentieth century, Choctaw communal lands were allotted to households of tribal members prior to the dissolution of the Choctaw Nation government to extinguish land claims, and incorporation of the territory into the new state of Oklahoma. Tribal members were registered as Choctaw by blood, but most Freedmen were classified as Black if they had visibly African-American features. They did not share equally with By Blood Choctaws in the allotment of Choctaw lands and resources.

During the following decades, the Choctaw Freedmen continued to face considerable discrimination in terms of social identity and political legislation. While by the late twentieth century, the Choctaw had considered accepting mixed-race Choctaw of partial white ancestry as Indian citizens, they continued to classify Choctaw Freedmen strictly as descendants of African Americans.

Government involvement 
According to People's World, the United States government supported slavery among the tribes in Southeastern United States, in order to have the native populations assimilate with white settlers. By adopting slavery, the tribes would no longer protect enslaved African Americans who fled as refugees from plantations. This view does not have consensus among historians.

Before introducing black slavery, colonists had attempted to enslave indigenous people in early 1760s. However, smallpox killed 30% of the total indigenous population - which left the slavery system ineffective. Additionally, given that the indigenous inhabitants were on their own land and knew it better than the colonists, escape was far easier for them.

In the 17th century the incorporation of race-based slavery became an efficient alternative for wealthy members of the Choctaw Nation to maintain an increasingly tenuous hold on political and cultural autonomy against Western expansion, while it allowed them to pursue economic and diplomatic goals that benefited them. African slavery among the Choctaws was a growing and widely accepted institution but it differed from Southern slavery in that it was normally not practiced for profit. Rather, the Choctaw held slaves in order to avoid doing agricultural work themselves. In addition, the Choctaw were aware that if they manumitted (freed) their slaves, the bordering slave states of Texas and Arkansas might overrun their nation to eliminate a local safe haven for runaways.

Post-Dawes Commission 
In 1894, the Dawes Commission was established to register Choctaw and other families of the Indian Territory so that each tribe's communal lands could be allotted among its heads of households. The final list included 18,981 citizens of the Choctaw Nation, 1,639 Mississippi Choctaw, and 5,994 former slaves (and descendants of former slaves), most of them associated with Choctaw in the Indian/Oklahoma Territory. Following completion of the land allotments, the US proposed to end the tribal governments of the Five Civilized Tribes and to admit the two territories jointly as a state.

The direct "articles of the allotment" rules were published in The Daily Ardmorite; details spanned the entire front page of the newspaper. The rules brought up the issue of identify, and affected more than land distribution. For instance, in February 1896, Susan Brashears came before the Commissioner to the Five Civilized Tribes in Muskogee, in order to request that her four children be placed on the Dawes Rolls as Choctaw Indian "by blood". Their father was her former husband Oliver Stock (or Boss) McCoy, a recognized and enrolled Choctaw citizen; he was of mixed Choctaw and white ancestry, with a Choctaw mother. Their children had been recorded on the 1885 census as half-Choctaw and full citizens because of their father's status. But Brashears's appeal was rejected.

According to the 1897 deal between the Dawes Commission and the Choctaw Nation, the tribal government would allot the tribal land and divide it among its citizens. That was approximately 15,000 Choctaws, 5,000 Freedmen, and 1,500 intermarried white citizens. Both the Choctaw and intermarried white citizens would receive 320 acres of land per household on average, while Freedmen were allotted less than 40 acres per household. Susan's attempt to be recognized as a full-blooded Choctaw was turned down. In doing so the council rejected the possibility of her having Indian blood, due to her mother's classification as black, but she may have been of mixed ancestry.

The federal Stigler Act of 1947 directed that protected allotted lands of members of the Five Tribes must be owned by someone with a quantum of at least  native blood in order for it to remain under federal protections. If land was passed to a relative with less than  native blood, the land had to be taken out of federal protection. This requirement resulted in tribal members losing land that in some cases their families had farmed or had ranches on for generations. But in 2018, both the House and Senate voted unanimously for an amendment to remove that blook quantum requirement for the Five Tribes. This change put them on the same basis as other tribal members in Oklahoma. It enables enrolled tribal members to preserve family lands under federal protection.  

In a 2018 interview, US Representative Markwayne Mullin (Cherokee) (R-OK) who co-sponsored the bill with Tom Cole (Chickasaw)(R-OK), said that the last person in his family who met the blood quantum criterion was his great-aunt, even though his family still owned and farmed the land their ancestors had farmed and been allotted. He noted that the amended Stigler Act put the Five Tribes on the same basis as others in Oklahoma, allowing them to retain allotted lands in protected status and thus strengthen families and the tribes.

In 2007 Principal Chief George Wickliffe of United Keetoowah Band Of Cherokee had expressed his concern about what he viewed as threats to sovereignty for all tribes because of the Cherokee Nation's freedmen controversy. He believed that the Cherokee Nation's refusal to abide by the Treaty of 1866 was a threat to the government-to-government relationships of all Native tribes.

See also
 African Americans with native heritage
 Cherokee freedmen
 Creek Freedmen
 Black Seminoles
 Oak Hill Industrial Academy

Citations

External links
Choctaw Nation of Oklahoma (official site)
Choctaw Freedmen
Choctaw Freedmen of Oklahoma
United States v. Choctaw Nation, 193 U.S. 115 (1904) (U.S. Supreme Court case over post-emancipation compensation)

 
African-American history of Mississippi
African-American history of Oklahoma
Multiracial affairs in the Americas